Brachynemurus is a genus of antlions in the family Myrmeleontidae. There are at least 20 described species in Brachynemurus.

Species
These 21 species belong to the genus Brachynemurus:

 Brachynemurus abdominalis (Say, 1823) i c g b
 Brachynemurus blandus (Hagen, 1861) i c g
 Brachynemurus californicus Banks, 1895 i c g
 Brachynemurus carolinus Banks, 1911 i c g
 Brachynemurus divisus (Navás, 1928) i c g
 Brachynemurus elongatus Banks, 1904 i c g
 Brachynemurus exiguus (Navás, 1920) i c g
 Brachynemurus ferox (Walker, 1853) i c g
 Brachynemurus fuscus (Banks, 1905) i c g
 Brachynemurus henshawi (Hagen, 1887) i c g
 Brachynemurus hubbardii Currie, 1898 i c g b
 Brachynemurus irregularis Currie, 1906 i c g
 Brachynemurus longicaudus (Burmeister, 1839) i c g b
 Brachynemurus mexicanus Banks, 1895 i c g
 Brachynemurus nebulosus (Olivier, 1811) i c g b
 Brachynemurus pulchellus Banks, 1911 i c g
 Brachynemurus ramburi Banks, 1907 i c g
 Brachynemurus sackeni Hagen, 1888 i c g b
 Brachynemurus seminolae Stange, 1970 i c g
 Brachynemurus signatus (Hagen, 1887) i c g b
 Brachynemurus versutus (Walker, 1853) i c g

Data sources: i = ITIS, c = Catalogue of Life, g = GBIF, b = Bugguide.net

References

Further reading

External links

 

Myrmeleontidae
Articles created by Qbugbot